National Museum of Prehistory may refer to:
National Museum of Prehistory (Taiwan), in Taitung, Taiwan
Museum of Archaeology, Tainan Branch of National Museum of Prehistory, a branch of the above museum in Tainan, Taiwan
Pigorini National Museum of Prehistory and Ethnography, in Rome, Italy
, a museum in France that holds the prehistoric carving known as Bison Licking Insect Bite

Buildings and structures disambiguation pages